Tomáš Tujvel (born 19 September 1983) is a Slovak football goalkeeper who currently plays for Hungarian club Budapest Honvéd.

Career
In July 2009, he joined Hungarian club Videoton FC.

External links
at vidi.hu

References

1983 births
Living people
Sportspeople from Nitra
Slovak footballers
Association football goalkeepers
FC Nitra players
Fehérvár FC players
Kecskeméti TE players
FC DAC 1904 Dunajská Streda players
Mezőkövesdi SE footballers
Budapest Honvéd FC players
Slovak Super Liga players
Nemzeti Bajnokság I players
Slovak expatriate footballers
Expatriate footballers in Hungary
Slovak expatriate sportspeople in Hungary